County Line station may refer to:

County Line station (NHSL), a SEPTA Norristown High Speed Line station in Radnor Township, Pennsylvania
County Line station (RTD), an RTD commuter rail station in Lone Tree, Colorado
County Line station (SEPTA Regional Rail), in Upper Southampton Township, Pennsylvania

See also
County Line (disambiguation)